Munk is a surname. Notable people with the surname include:

 Munk (born 1965), alias of Estonian actor and singer Ivo Uukkivi
 Anders Munk (1922–1989), Danish mycologist
 Andrzej Munk (1920–1961), Polish film director
 Eduard Munk (1803–1871), German philologist
 Elie Munk (1900–1981), German-born French rabbi and rabbinic scholar
 Hermann Munk (1839–1912), German physiologist
 Jens Munk (1579–1628), Danish explorer of the Arctic
 József Munk (b. 1890), Hungarian Olympic medalist swimmer
 Kaj Munk (1898–1944), Danish playwright
 Kirsten Munk (1598–1658), morganatic wife of Christian IV of Denmark
 Ludvig Munk (1537–1602), Governor-general of Norway from 1577 to 1583
 Marc-David Munk (born 1973), Physician and executive
 Max Munk (1890–1986), NASA, aerodynamics, Variable-Density Wind tunnel 1921
 Nina Munk (born 1967), American journalist and non-fiction writer
 Peter Munk (1927–2018), Canadian businessman and philanthropist
 Salomon Munk (1803–1867), French Orientalist
 Walter Heinrich Munk (1917–2019), American oceanographer
 William Munk (1816–1898) English physician, compiler of Munk's Roll

See also
 Munk (disambiguation)